Robert Ira Price (September 22, 1921 – October 20, 2019) was a  United States Coast Guard vice admiral. He graduated from the United States Coast Guard Academy in 1945. He served as Commander of the Coast Guard Atlantic Area and Third Coast Guard District. Price was awarded the Legion of Merit and a gold star in lieu of a second award of the medal for his service. He died October 20, 2019, aged 98.

References

1921 births
2019 deaths
Military personnel from New York City
United States Coast Guard Academy alumni
United States Coast Guard admirals
Recipients of the Legion of Merit